A Tree Grows in Brooklyn is a 1974 American TV film from 20th Century Fox based on the novel.

It was produced by Norman Rosemont.

Cast
Cliff Robertson as Johnny Nolan
Diane Baker as Katie Nolan
James Olsen as McShane
Pamelyn Ferdin as Francie Nolan
Nancy Malone as Aunt Sissy
Michael-James Wixted as Neely Nolan
Liam Dunn as Barker
Anne Seymour as Miss Tilford
Allyn Ann McLerie as Miss Martin
Booth Colman

References

External links

1974 television films
1974 films
Films directed by Joseph Hardy (director)
American television films